Urogonodes is a genus of moths belonging to the subfamily Drepaninae.

Species
 Urogonodes patiens Warren, 1906
 Urogonodes macrura Warren, 1923
 Urogonodes scintillans Warren, 1896
 Urogonodes clinala Wilkinson, 1972
 Urogonodes astralaina Wilkinson, 1972

Former species
 Urogonodes cervina Warren, 1923
 Urogonodes colorata Warren, 1907
 Urogonodes flavida Warren, 1907
 Urogonodes flaviplaga Warren, 1923
 Urogonodes fumosa Warren, 1923
 Urogonodes praecisa Warren, 1923

References

Drepaninae
Drepanidae genera